The Star Awards for Favourite Onscreen Partners (Variety) was an award presented annually at the Star Awards, a ceremony that was established in 1994.

The category was introduced in 2011, at the 17th Star Awards ceremony. It was given in honour of variety show partners that was deemed the most popular among the television audience. The nominees were determined by a team of judges employed by MediaCorp; winners were selected by a majority vote from the public via online voting.

Chen Biyu , Dennis Chew , Marcus Chin & Mark Lee  are the recent winners in this category for their performance in Yujian Huangchong (Weekend Edition). 

Michelle Chong and Quan were nominated twice, more than any other host. Chong also holds the record for the most nominations without a win.

The award was discontinued from 2011 and was replaced by the Favourite Host award in the following year.

Recipients

 Year is linked to the article about the Star Awards held that year.

Category facts

Most nominations

References

External links 

Star Awards